Protestantism in Poland is the third largest faith in Poland, after the Roman Catholic Church (32,440,722) and the Polish Orthodox Church (503,996). As of 2018 there were 103 registered Protestant denominations in Poland. Most Protestants (mainly Lutherans) in the country live in historically Protestant regions such as Cieszyn Silesia and Warmia-Masuria and in major urban areas. However, almost all urban and rural areas in Poland are predominantly Roman Catholic. The only town in the country with a majority Protestant population is Wisła.

Major denominations (with at least two thousand followers) classified as Protestant by Poland's Central Statistical Office (as of 2020) include:
 Evangelical-Augsburg Church in Poland: 60,900 members
 Pentecostal Church in Poland: 24,840 adherents
 Seventh-day Adventist Church in Poland: 9,838 adherents
 Fellowship of Christian Churches in Poland (Kościół Chrystusowy w RP): 6,645 adherents
 Baptist Union of Poland: 5,470 baptized members
 New Apostolic Church in Poland: 5,257 adherents
 Church of God in Christ (Pentecostal): 5,023 adherents
 United Methodist Church in Poland: 4,443 adherents
 Evangelical-Reformed Church in Poland: 3,200 adherents
 Church of Free Christians in the Republic of Poland: 3,045 adherents (data for 2019)
 Church of God in Poland (Pentecostal): 2,826 adherents
 Church of Evangelical Christians in the Republic of Poland: 2,357 adherents

See also
Reformation in Poland
Catholic Church in Poland

References